Chris Larkin (born Christopher Stephens, 19 June 1967) is an English actor.

Early life 
Born Christopher Larkin Stephens on 19 June 1967 in London, Larkin is the elder son of actors Dame Maggie Smith and Sir Robert Stephens. His younger brother is actor Toby Stephens. Larkin revealed in an interview that he chose his stage name in order to distance himself from his famous parents, not wanting "to trade on the family connection", and selecting Larkin in honour of his favourite poet Philip Larkin.

Career 
Larkin trained at the London Academy of Music and Dramatic Art (LAMDA). He is best known for playing Hermann Göring in the film Hitler: The Rise of Evil, but also played Charles Darwin for the PBS series Evolution and the abolitionist William Wilberforce in the radio production of Grace Victorious. Larkin also played Capt. Howard of the Marines in Peter Weir's Master and Commander: The Far Side of the World alongside Paul Bettany and Russell Crowe, and appeared in Valkyrie with Tom Cruise playing Sgt. Helm. Other film credits are Angels and Insects, Franco Zeffirelli's Jane Eyre and Tea with Mussolini, and Heroes and Villains directed by Selwyn Roberts.

Larkin played Cambridge in three series of John Sullivan's Roger Roger for BBC1 and George Marsden in Charles Sturridge's critically acclaimed Shackleton for Channel Four. Larkin also appeared in the 2007 episode of Doctor Who "The Shakespeare Code" and the 2012 low-budget horror film The Facility (originally titled Guinea Pigs) directed by Ian Clark.

In 2013 he starred in the television revival of Yes, Prime Minister as Bernard Woolley, reprising the role he had played in the Gielgud Theatre in London's West End.

Other theatre credits include: Edgar in The Lady from Dubuque starring his mother, Maggie Smith, and directed by Anthony Page; Jopari in Nicholas Hytner's production of His Dark Materials at The National Theatre; The Whisky Taster by James Graham at the Bush Theatre, London; and the nationwide tour of Noises Off, directed by Lindsay Posner.

Filmography

References

External links 

1967 births
Living people
20th-century English male actors
21st-century English male actors
Alumni of the London Academy of Music and Dramatic Art
English male film actors
English male television actors
English people of Scottish descent
Male actors from London